Reeves Gabrels (born June 4, 1956) is an American guitarist, songwriter and record producer. A member and guitarist of British band the Cure since 2012, Gabrels worked with David Bowie from 1987 to 1999 and was a member of the band Tin Machine. He has lived in New York, Boston, London, Los Angeles, Nashville, and New York's Hudson Valley. His Nashville-based band since 2007, Reeves Gabrels & His Imaginary Friends, features Gabrels on guitar and vocals.

As a guitarist, Gabrels is recognized for his virtuosity and versatility, able to "explore sonic extremes with a great, adaptive intuition for what each song needs most." He has been characterized as "one of the most daring rock-guitar improvisers since Jimi Hendrix".

As a songwriter and composer, Gabrels spans genres. The songs on Ulysses, an album from 2000, range from "hard-hitting blues rock to 21st-century electronica", as Guitar World put it.

Describing Rockonica, in 2005 Guitar Players Andy Ellis wrote, Gabrels walks the line between song structure and wiggy sonics like no one else... His tunes on Rockonica have familiar verse/chorus construction (and are often maddeningly catchy), and his riffs and solos typically possess the contours that define classic rock. But bubbling and roiling under and around this foundation are layers of eerie, broken sounds and oddball textures. And Gabrels isn't shy about juxtaposing genres. For example, "Underneath" ends with a trippy mélange of Wheels of Fire-era Clapton licks, acoustic Delta blues riffs, and fluttering, guitar-generated helicopter sounds.

Early life and education
Reeves Gabrels was born in Staten Island, New York City, New York in June 1956. His mother, Claire, was a typist, and his father, Carl Winston Gabrels, worked as a deckhand on tugboats in New York Harbor. 

Reeves started playing guitar at age 13, and the following year (1971) his father arranged for lessons with the father's friend and contemporary Turk Van Lake, who lived in the neighborhood. Van Lake was a professional musician who had played with Benny Goodman and others.

After high school, Gabrels attended the Parsons School of Design and the School of Visual Arts in New York City and continued to play guitar. He met jazz guitarist John Scofield, from whom he took several lessons. Encouraged by Scofield's example and advice, Gabrels moved to Boston to attend the Berklee School of Music. He left without a degree in 1981, valuing nonetheless his experience at Berklee.

Career
Gabrels began his musical career in earnest in Boston, building on performance experience starting in high school. During the 1980s and early 1990s he was a member of bands including The Dark, Life on Earth, The Atom Said, Rubber Rodeo, The Bentmen and Modern Farmer. Modern Farmer (Gabrels, Jamie Rubin, David Hull, and Billy Beard) issued an album of original rock songs, Hard Row to Hoe, on Victory/Universal in 1993.

David Bowie and Tin Machine

David Bowie and Gabrels met in 1987 during a Bowie tour for which Sara Terry, Gabrels' then-wife, worked as a publicist. The first project on which Gabrels worked with Bowie was a re-imagining and rearrangement of the song "Look Back in Anger" and its live performance combining dance, music and projection as part of a benefit for London's Institute of Contemporary Arts (ICA) in 1988. The resulting score was  minutes long, whereas the song originally ran three minutes as written by Bowie and Brian Eno and recorded on Lodger (1979). Bowie sang, played and danced with members of the avant-garde troupe La La La Human Steps; Gabrels and two other musicians played onstage throughout. "We went into the studio to rearrange it," said Bowie in a filmed interview; "I like the hard-edged wall of guitar sound that we put into it."

Gabrels subsequently (1989–1992) joined forces with Bowie and the Sales brothers (drummer Hunt Sales and bass player Tony Sales) in the rock band Tin Machine. Gabrels carried on working with Bowie, becoming an essential part of Bowie's nineties sound, most notably on Outside (1995), Earthling (1997), and Hours (1999), the latter two of which he co-produced. "Dead Man Walking," a Bowie/Gabrels song from Earthling, was nominated for a Grammy award.  Gabrels and Bowie also created the soundtrack to the computer game Omikron: The Nomad Soul in 1999 for the game's French publisher.  Gabrels ended his professional association with Bowie in late 1999. His last stage appearance with Bowie was a performance recorded in New York City for VH1 Storytellers.

The Cure
Robert Smith of the Cure and Reeves Gabrels first met during rehearsals for Bowie's 50th Birthday Concert held on January 9, 1997, at Madison Square Garden in New York. Bowie had invited Smith to sing as one of a select group of guest performers at this event, for which Gabrels served as musical director. A friendship ensued, leading to further collaborations within the year. Gabrels and Smith co-wrote a song, "Yesterday's Gone" and recorded it, with Smith guesting on vocals, for the Reeves Gabrels album Ulysses (Della Notte). Gabrels recorded lead guitar as a guest on the Cure's single "Wrong Number" and he also appeared on stage with the Cure for several songs ("Wrong Number" included) on selected nights of a fall U.S. tour in 1997. Further, Gabrels, Smith and the Cure's drummer Jason Cooper (as COGASM) wrote and recorded "Sign From God" for Orgazmo, a film directed by Trey Parker.

Smith and Gabrels stayed in touch, leading some 15 years later to a phone conversation that brought Gabrels on board as guitarist for the Cure, initially as a guest for a run of summer festivals in 2012, after which he became a member of the band. Gabrels was inducted into the Rock and Roll Hall of Fame in March 2019 as a member of the Cure, having initially been left off the list of nine current and former members.

Reeves Gabrels & His Imaginary Friends
For his own band, Reeves Gabrels & His Imaginary Friends, Gabrels is the vocalist, guitarist, and principal songwriter.

The band came together as a trio in Nashville in 2007, about a year after Gabrels moved from Los Angeles. The main players for seven years were Gabrels (guitar, vocals) with Kevin Hornback (bass) and Jeff Brown (drums). In 2015, drummer Marc Pisapia, who had substituted when schedule conflicts arose for Brown, became the principal drummer (and harmony vocalist).

Gabrels and band performed often at Nashville's Family Wash venue and toured regionally, including a ten-gig outing on a shoestring in 2009 about which the guitarist blogged for an Internet forum run by Guitar Player magazine.

In 2010 without any real plan, Reeves Gabrels and His Imaginary Friends began recording songs they'd worked out through performance, even though mixing, mastering, manufacture and release were beyond their means at the time. Then Gabrels joined The Cure, which helped with budget but complicated schedules. In a 2014 interview with the British magazine Guitarist (Nov 2014), Gabrels described the recording process and the unexpected ways the hiatus before release had contributed to the creative process. The album finally came out in January 2015.

Meanwhile, the trio of Gabrels, Hornback and Brown played small venues and pubs in England during October 2014. They toured the U.S. in the summer of 2015, now with Pisapia on drums and new CDs in hand, then made a second tour of England in the fall, marking the occasion with a digital-download-only single titled "Try" released exclusively on Bandcamp. A final U.S. show in 2015 in Nashville was recorded and resulted in an album, Imaginary Friends Live, released two years later. The trio took a break in 2016 while the Cure were on a world tour, then picked up again with three U.S. outings in July 2017, October 2017 and March 2018.

Solo recordings
Gabrels has produced six albums as principal songwriter, vocalist, guitarist and bandleader. As Reeves Gabrels, he released The Sacred Squall of Now (Rounder/Upstart, 1995); Ulysses (Della Notte) (Emagine, 2000); live...late...loud (Myth Music, 2003); and Rockonica (Myth Music/Favored Nations/Sony, 2005). Ulysses was nominated for a Yahoo! Internet Award in 1999 as a then-pathbreaking Internet release, before becoming available the following year on CD. One Ulysses song, "Jewel," features vocal and instrumental performances by Bowie, Dave Grohl and Frank Black. Gabrels made both Rockonica and live...late...loud in Los Angeles with musical friends there including Paul Ill (bass), Brock Avery (drums) and Greg McMullen (pedal steel guitar).

A fifth album, with Reeves Gabrels & His Imaginary Friends as artist name and title, came out digitally in January 2015 at Bandcamp and on CD (plus more digital distributors) on Friday, July 17, 2015. Reeves Gabrels & Rob Stennett were co-producers. The songs include originals and covers, with Gabrels singing, playing guitar and leading the band, a power trio with Kevin Hornback on bass and Jeff Brown on drums. Guest musicians also appear, including the band's current drummer Marc Pisapia singing background vocals. Reeves Gabrels & His Imaginary Friends received a first print review in the American monthly Vintage Guitar (June 2015).

Imaginary Friends Live, Gabrels' sixth album, came out on Bandcamp on October 1, 2017, and remains a download-only release. It was recorded on a single night during a live performance in December 2015 at The Family Wash/Garage Coffee's relocated premises on Main Street in East Nashville, Tennessee. The live album was cited as one of 13 "Top Records of 2017" by Michael Ross in Guitar Moderne. It was also picked for the "Best Music of 2017" by the editors of Premier Guitar. PG senior editor Ted Drozdowski's description: "Reeves Gabrels, Imaginary Friends Live: In which Gabrels rewrites the rock guitar bible in 11 live performances packed with so much invention it's head spinning. I was at Nashville's Family Wash the night this set was recorded, but it wasn't until I heard it here that my mind was entirely blown by the former Bowie/current Cure axe-destroyer's execution. Every song is packed with 'holy fuck' qualities: epic tones, killer riffs, brilliantly tossed-off fills and digressions, and solos that soothe, stun, and drip with lysergic intelligence. Raw and impeccable at the same time. If you dig rock guitar that straddles the trad and the rad with absolute authority, this is an essential album. No bullshit!"

Soundtracks
Gabrels has written soundtracks for films including David Sutherland's The Farmer's Wife (premiered on PBS September 1998) and for PBS productions, and collaborated with Public Enemy on the song "Go Cat Go" for the Spike Lee film He Got Game (soundtrack, Def Jam, 1998).  He wrote the "club music" portions of the soundtrack for the video game Deus Ex.

Performing and recording with others
Gabrels from time to time toured as a guitarist in a supporting role, for example in late 1993/early 1994 as guitarist for solo performances by singer Paul Rodgers, and outings in 2009 with New York-based punk band Jeebus.

Galore, a 1998 album by singer-songwriter Jeffrey Gaines features Gabrels on guitar alongside Bowie bandmates Gail Ann Dorsey and Zachary Alford.

In Los Angeles from 2000 to 2005, beyond work on his own music live and recorded, Gabrels collaborated with Southern California musicians in varied genres. For the soulful, funky blues-rock of singer and keyboard player Gerard "Gerry" Duran, Gabrels recorded guitar on several albums by the band Los Duran. Gabrels and drummer/producer Big Swede, as a duo dubbed Protecto, put out an electronica album titled Sonicnauts.

Another recording project into which Los Angeles-based drummer Big Swede brought Gabrels was X-World/5, a Heavy metal supergroup made up of guitarist Andy LaRocque, vocalist Nils K. Rue, bass player Magnus Rosén, and Big Swede on drums. They made one album, New Universal Order, originally put out in 2008 by German label AFM Records. It was re-released by the band/Big Swede in 2015.

In Nashville, Tennessee, his home since 2006, Gabrels has played often locally with his own band and others. He was a regular at The Family Wash, an East Nashville restaurant/music venue that closed in 2018 but before that had a long run with wide-ranging music programming thanks to founder Jamie Rubin, Gabrels' longtime friend and associate.  When Gabrels first arrived, he became a guitarist for Brandon Giles & the Tricky Two playing bars and clubs on Nashville's Lower Broadway and occasionally on tour. In 2010 and 2011, Gabrels participated in "From Nashville to Norway" festivals in Gjøvik, Norway, organized by friends from both locales. In 2014, he began sitting in when possible with guitarist Tim Carroll at the 5 Spot venue. At the time, Carroll's band included drummer Steve Latanation and the late bass player Bones Hillman (who subsequently returned to working with his longtime band Midnight Oil).

Several collaborative recordings grew out of Gabrels' Nashville activities. The Magnificent Others features Jamie Rubin's songs and lead vocals, with Gabrels on lead guitar. Sonic Mining Company, a Ropeadope Records 2012 release, is made up of improvisations by Gabrels (guitar), Frank Howard Swart (bass) and Adam Abrashoff (drums).

Gabrels added guitar parts to selected recordings by other musicians over the years, including songs by gODHEAD, by Jed Davis, and by Jenn Vix, a bass player and vocalist from Providence, Rhode Island. Past recordings with Gabrels guitar tracks include albums or singles by The Mission, Deaf School, Sandie Shaw, The Rolling Stones, Ozzy Osbourne and others.

In 2021/2022, Gabrels contributed guitars to Big Scenic Nowhere's sophomore album, The Long Morrow.

Club D'Elf and improvisation
Gabrels performs periodically with Club d'Elf, a Boston-based instrumental group led by bassist Mike Rivard. Their performances are largely instrumental and emphasize lengthy, improvised songs touching on jazz, Moroccan music, electronic and other genres. Gabrels appears on Now I Understand, (Accurate Records, 2006), their first studio recording; the album also features John Medeski and Billy Martin, DJ Logic, Mat Maneri, Duke Levine, Alain Mallet, Mister Rourke, and more. Improvising in long form gives Gabrels "the time to meander and harmonically poke at things, make the music interesting," he said in a Berklee College of Music interview in 2012. He went on to explain that free improvisation contributes to his ability in different settings, such as on stage with the Cure, "to refine that down to opportunities where I can hit that one note that throws the world off its axis for two bars," yet to do so fully within the context of the song and its lyrics.

Instrumental guitar-duo collaborations (full-album co-productions)
American slide guitarist David Tronzo, a fellow participant in Club D'Elf performances, and Gabrels made an instrumental album together, Night in Amnesia, issued by Rounder Records in 1995. The innovative British guitarist Bill Nelson (Be-Bop Deluxe, Bill Nelson's Red Noise) and Gabrels together released a quite different experimental guitar-duo album, Fantastic Guitars, independently in 2014.

Instruments
Guitars: Gabrels has used different guitars at varied phases in his musical career, selecting instruments to suit the music.  He has favored Steinberger guitars, the Parker Fly, and Fernandes Guitars, but also plays Gibson Guitars such as the Les Paul and the Flying V, as well as Fender's Stratocaster.

He has often chosen less well-known makers, explaining in interviews that he prefers a guitar without a set history and with which he is free to create sounds of his own imagination.

In 2008, Gabrels began playing Reverend guitars, designed by Reverend Musical Instruments, now of Toledo, Ohio. Gabrels and Reverend have since collaborated to develop a series of Reverend Reeves Gabrels signature model guitars. The first featured at the winter 2010 NAMM Show in Anaheim, California. An update, the Reverend Reeves Gabrels II (RG2) was released at NAMM in Nashville in 2012.

The Reeves Gabrels Spacehawk made its debut at NAMM, winter 2014.

The Reeves Gabrels Dirtbike, a single-pickup model, came out in July 2017.

During the Cure's summer tour in 2012, Smith gave Gabrels his Fender Bass VI, used to play songs such as "Primary", "In Between Days", "Push", "Plainsong", "Untitled", "Jupiter Crash", "Before Three" and "(I Don't Know What's Going) On". In response to questions about his guitars, Gabrels wrote several Notes posted to his Facebook Musician page describing the guitars played with the Cure and explaining how he uses them to suit the music of the songs for which he chooses them.

Personal life
Susan Van Wie Kastan and Gabrels married in January 2018 in Saratoga Springs, New York. Acquainted since 1998 and boyfriend and girlfriend since both moved to Nashville, Tennessee, in 2006, they now reside in Troy, New York, where her family has roots and they are near the Catskills where he attended high school. Susan Gabrels serves as business manager for her husband and his band Reeves Gabrels & His Imaginary Friends. Both spouses were previously married and divorced. Gabrels had married Sara Terry, an American journalist, in 1985. It was through Terry's work as a press agent for the Glass Spider Tour in 1987 that Gabrels originally became friends with Bowie.

Partial discography 
Tin Machine
Tin Machine (1989)
Tin Machine II (1991)
Tin Machine Live: Oy Vey, Baby (1992)

David Bowie
Black Tie White Noise (1993)
Outside (1995)
Earthling (1997)
Earthling in the City (1997)
Hours (1999)
LiveAndWell.com (1999)
VH1 Storytellers (recorded and broadcast 1999; released on CD and DVD in 2009)

Reeves Gabrels
The Sacred Squall of Now (1995)
Ulysses (Della Notte) (1999)
live...late...loud (2003)
Rockonica (2005)
Reeves Gabrels and His Imaginary Friends (2015)
Imaginary Friends Live (2017)

Collaborations (by Reeves Gabrels as album co-producer, co-writer, artist/performer)
Too Happy (1988) by Too Happy
Hard Row to Hoe (1994) by Modern Farmer
Night In Amnesia (1995) with David Tronzo (guitar-duo instrumental album)
Sonicnauts (2006) by Protecto
The Magnificent Others (2011) by The Magnificent Others
Sonic Mining Company (2012) by Sonic Mining Company
Fantastic Guitars (2014) with Bill Nelson (guitar-duo instrumental album)

The Cure
"Wrong Number" on Galore (1997) by The Cure features guitars by Reeves Gabrels (as guest)

Other Guest Performances/Song Collaborations
Carved in Sand (1990) by The Mission (band) features additional guitar by Reeves Gabrels on "Into the Blue" and "Hungry as the Hunter"
Emotional Rain (1994) by Lee Aaron features guitars by Reeves Gabrels & Knox Chandler on all but two tracks
Cortlandt (1996) by Sean Malone features guitars by Reeves Gabrels on "At Taliesin"
Left of the Middle (1997) by Natalie Imbruglia, produced by Phil Thornalley, features guitars by Reeves Gabrels on "Don't You Think"
Metropolis (1997) by Sister Machine Gun features guitar performances by Reeves Gabrels, tracks not specified
He Got Game (soundtrack) (1998) by Public Enemy features guitar by Reeves Gabrels on "Go Cat Go"
Live 3/28/02 Athens GA (2003) by Club d'Elf features Reeves Gabrels on guitar throughout
Now I Understand (2006) by Club d'Elf features Reeves Gabrels on guitar
Emperors of Medieval Japan (2015) by Lisa Ronson features guitar by Reeves Gabrels as a guest on "Shopping and F*cking" and "Get To You"
Fist Full of Devils (2021) by Earl Slick features ambient guitar by Reeves Gabrels on "Emerald"
The Long Morrow (2022) by Big Scenic Nowhere features guitars by Reeves Gabrels on the title track

References

1956 births
American rock guitarists
American male guitarists
The Cure members
Living people
People from Staten Island
Tin Machine members
Songwriters from New York (state)
American male singers
Lead guitarists
21st-century American guitarists
Berklee College of Music alumni
Guitarists from New York City
20th-century American guitarists